A Bronx Morning is a 1931 American Pre-Code avant-garde film by American filmmaker Jay Leyda (1910–1988).

Described as "city symphony", the eleven-minute European style film recorded a Bronx street in New York City before it is crowded with traffic. Largely unnoticed in the United States, on the strength of this film Leyda was invited to study with Soviet filmmaker Sergei Eisenstein, the only American to do so. In 2004, A Bronx Morning was selected for preservation in the United States National Film Registry by the Library of Congress as being "culturally, historically, or aesthetically significant".

The film was funded with the proceeds of a sale of a wooden figurine of Henry Ward Beecher, which Leyda had originally found in a junk shop, to a representative of Abby Aldrich Rockefeller.

References

External links
A Bronx Morning essay by Scott Simmon on the National Film Registry site. 
A Bronx Morning essay by Daniel Eagan in America's Film Legacy: The Authoritative Guide to the Landmark Movies in the National Film Registry, A&C Black, 2010 , pages 189-190 

1931 films
1930s avant-garde and experimental films
1931 short films
American black-and-white films
American avant-garde and experimental films
Articles containing video clips
Films directed by Jay Leyda
Films set in the Bronx
Films shot in New York City
United States National Film Registry films
1930s American films